Divine Love is an album by American jazz trumpeter and composer Leo Smith recorded in 1978 and released on the ECM label.

Reception
The Penguin Guide to Jazz selected this album as part of its suggested Core Collection.

In a review for AllMusic, Thom Jurek wrote: "Smith acts as conductor, soloist, and his own sideman here; he opens the field on Divine Love through the authority of his players, each of whom receives the colorful possibilities he presents with unguarded openness and the desire to expand on them."

Track listing
All compositions by Leo Smith
 "Divine Love" - 21:47
 "Tastalun" - 6:38
 "Spirituals: Language of Love" - 15:28
Recorded at Tonstudio Bauer in Ludwigsburg, West Germany in September 1978

Personnel
Leo Smith - trumpet, flugelhorn, gong, percussion
Dwight Andrews - alto flute, bass clarinet, tenor saxophone, triangles, mbira
Bobby Naughton - vibraharp, marimba, bells
Lester Bowie, Kenny Wheeler - trumpet (track 2)
Charlie Haden - bass (track 3)

References

ECM Records albums
Wadada Leo Smith albums
1979 albums
Albums produced by Manfred Eicher